In chemical nomenclature, the IUPAC nomenclature of inorganic chemistry is a systematic method of naming inorganic chemical compounds, as recommended by the International Union of Pure and Applied Chemistry (IUPAC). It is published in Nomenclature of Inorganic Chemistry (which is informally called the Red Book). Ideally, every inorganic compound should have a name from which an unambiguous formula can be determined.  There is also an IUPAC nomenclature of organic chemistry.

System 
The names "caffeine" and "3,7-dihydro-1,3,7-trimethyl-1H-purine-2,6-dione" both signify the same chemical compound. The systematic name encodes the structure and composition of the caffeine molecule in some detail, and provides an unambiguous reference to this compound, whereas the name "caffeine" just names it. These advantages make the systematic name far superior to the common name when absolute clarity and precision are required. However, for the sake of brevity, even professional chemists will use the non-systematic name almost all of the time, because caffeine is a well-known common chemical with a unique structure. Similarly, H2O is most often simply called water in English, though other chemical names do exist.

 Single atom anions are named with an -ide suffix: for example, H− is hydride.
 Compounds with a positive ion (cation): The name of the compound is simply the cation's name (usually the same as the element's), followed by the anion. For example, NaCl is sodium chloride, and CaF2 is calcium fluoride.
 Cations of transition metals able to take multiple charges are labeled with Roman numerals in parentheses to indicate their charge. For example, Cu+ is copper(I), Cu2+ is copper(II). An older, deprecated notation is to append -ous or -ic to the root of the Latin name to name ions with a lesser or greater charge. Under this naming convention, Cu+ is cuprous and Cu2+ is cupric.  For naming metal complexes see the page on complex (chemistry).
 Oxyanions (polyatomic anions containing oxygen) are named with -ite or -ate, for a lesser or greater quantity of oxygen, respectively. For example,  is nitrite, while  is nitrate.
 The prefix bi- is a deprecated way of indicating the presence of a single hydrogen ion, as in "sodium bicarbonate" (NaHCO3). The modern method specifically names the hydrogen atom. Thus, NaHCO3 would be pronounced sodium hydrogen carbonate.

Positively charged ions are called cations and negatively charged ions are called anions. The cation is always named first. Ions can be metals, non-metals or polyatomic ions. Therefore, the name of the metal or positive polyatomic ion is followed by the name of the non-metal or negative polyatomic ion. The positive ion retains its element name whereas for a single non-metal anion the ending is changed to -ide.

Example: sodium chloride, potassium oxide, or calcium carbonate.

When the metal has more than one possible ionic charge or oxidation number the name becomes ambiguous. In these cases the oxidation number (the same as the charge) of the metal ion is represented by a Roman numeral in parentheses immediately following the metal ion name. For example, in uranium(VI) fluoride the oxidation number of uranium is 6.  Another example is the iron oxides. FeO is iron(II) oxide and Fe2O3 is iron(III) oxide.

An older system used prefixes and suffixes to indicate the oxidation number, according to the following scheme:

Thus the four oxyacids of chlorine are called hypochlorous acid (HOCl),
chlorous acid (HOClO), chloric acid (HOClO2) and perchloric acid (HOClO3), and their respective conjugate bases are hypochlorite, chlorite, chlorate and perchlorate ions. This system has partially fallen out of use, but survives in the common names of many chemical compounds: the modern literature contains few references to "ferric chloride" (instead calling it "iron(III) chloride"), but names like "potassium permanganate" (instead of "potassium manganate(VII)") and "sulfuric acid" abound.

Traditional naming

Simple ionic compounds
An ionic compound is named by its cation followed by its anion. See polyatomic ion for a list of possible ions.

For cations that take on multiple charges, the charge is written using Roman numerals in parentheses immediately following the element name. For example, Cu(NO3)2 is copper(II) nitrate, because the charge of two nitrate ions is 2 × −1 = −2, and since the net charge of the ionic compound must be zero, the Cu ion has a 2+ charge. This compound is therefore copper(II) nitrate. In the case of cations with a +4 oxidation state, the only acceptable format for the Roman numeral 4 is IV and not IIII.

The Roman numerals in fact show the oxidation number, but in simple ionic compounds (i.e., not metal complexes) this will always equal the ionic charge on the metal. For a simple overview see  , for more details see selected pages from IUPAC rules for naming inorganic compounds .

List of common ion names
Monatomic anions:
 chloride
 sulfide
 phosphide

Polyatomic ions:
 ammonium
 hydronium
 nitrate
 nitrite
 hypochlorite
 chlorite
 chlorate
 perchlorate
 sulfite
 sulfate
 thiosulfate
 hydrogen sulfite (or bisulfite)
 hydrogen carbonate (or bicarbonate)
 carbonate
 phosphate
 hydrogen phosphate
 dihydrogen phosphate
 chromate
 dichromate
 borate
 arsenate
 oxalate
 cyanide
 thiocyanate
 permanganate

Hydrates 
Hydrates are ionic compounds that have absorbed water. They are named as the ionic compound followed by a numerical prefix and -hydrate. The numerical prefixes used are listed below (see IUPAC numerical multiplier):
 mono-
 di-
 tri-
 tetra-
 penta-
 hexa-
 hepta-
 octa-
 nona-
 deca-
For example, CuSO4·5H2O is "copper(II) sulfate pentahydrate".

Molecular compounds 
Inorganic molecular compounds are named with a prefix (see list above) before each element. The more electronegative element is written last and with an -ide suffix. For example, H2O (water) can be called dihydrogen monoxide. Organic molecules do not follow this rule. In addition, the prefix mono- is not used with the first element; for example, SO2 is sulfur dioxide, not "monosulfur dioxide". Sometimes prefixes are shortened when the ending vowel of the prefix "conflicts" with a starting vowel in the compound. This makes the name easier to pronounce; for example, CO is "carbon monoxide" (as opposed to "monooxide").

Common exceptions 
The "a" of the penta- prefix is not dropped before a vowel. As the IUPAC Red Book 2005 page 69 states, "The final vowels of multiplicative prefixes should not be elided (although 'monoxide', rather than 'monooxide', is an allowed exception because of general usage)."

There are a number of exceptions and special cases that violate the above rules. Sometimes the prefix is left off the initial atom: I2O5 is known as iodine pentaoxide,  but it should be called diiodine pentaoxide. N2O3 is called nitrogen sesquioxide (sesqui- means ).

The main oxide of phosphorus is called phosphorus pentaoxide. It should actually be diphosphorus pentaoxide, but it is assumed that there are two phosphorus atoms (P2O5), as they are needed in order to balance the oxidation numbers of the five oxygen atoms. However, people have known for years that the real form of the molecule is P4O10, not P2O5, yet it is not normally called tetraphosphorus decaoxide.

In writing formulas, ammonia is NH3 even though nitrogen is more electronegative (in line with the convention used by IUPAC as detailed in Table VI of the red book). Likewise, methane is written as CH4 even though carbon is more electronegative (Hill system).

Nomenclature of Inorganic Chemistry

Nomenclature of Inorganic Chemistry, commonly referred to by chemists as the Red Book, is a collection of recommendations on IUPAC nomenclature,  published at irregular intervals by the IUPAC. The last full edition was published in 2005, in both paper and electronic versions.

See also 
IUPAC nomenclature
IUPAC nomenclature of organic chemistry
List of inorganic compounds
Water of crystallization
IUPAC nomenclature of inorganic chemistry 2005 (the Red Book)
Nomenclature of Organic Chemistry (the Blue Book)
Quantities, Units and Symbols in Physical Chemistry (the Green Book)
Compendium of Chemical Terminology (the Gold Book)
Compendium of Analytical Nomenclature (the Orange Book)

References

External links 
IUPAC website - Nomenclature
IUPAC (old site) Red Book
IUPAC (old site) Red Book - PDF (2005 Recommendations)
Recommendations 2000-Red Book II (incomplete)
IUPAC (old site) Nomenclature Books Series (commonly known as the "Colour Books")
ChemTeam Highschool Tutorial

Chemical nomenclature
Inorganic chemistry
Chemistry reference works